Ben E. King Sings for Soulful Lovers is the second studio album by Ben E. King.  The album was released by Atlantic Records in 1962.

Track listing
"My Heart Cries for You" (Percy Faith, Carl Sigman) – 2:21
"He Will Break Your Heart" (Jerry Butler, Curtis Mayfield, Calvin Carter) – 3:34
"Dream Lover" (Bobby Darin) – 2:38
"Will You Still Love Me Tomorrow" (Carole King, Gerry Goffin) – 3:11
"My Foolish Heart" (Ned Washington, Victor Young) – 2:38
"Fever" (John Davenport, Eddie Cooley) – 2:57
"Moon River" (Henry Mancini, Johnny Mercer) – 2:52
"What a Difference a Day Made" (María Grever, Stanley Adams) – 2:43
"Because of You" (Arthur Hammerstein) – 2:56
"At Last" (Mack Gordon, Harry Warren) – 3:13
"On the Street Where You Live" (Alan Jay Lerner, Frederick Loewe) – 3:46
"It's All in the Game" (Carl Sigman, Charles G. Dawes) – 2:52

Personnel
Claus Ogerman - arrangements, conductor
Technical
Phil Iehle, Tom Dowd - engineer
Loring Eutemey - cover design
Maurice Seymour - cover photography

1962 albums
Ben E. King albums
Albums conducted by Claus Ogerman
Albums arranged by Claus Ogerman
Albums produced by Ahmet Ertegun
Atco Records albums